Berndt Abraham Godenhjelm (March 30, 1799 - 14 December 1881) was a Finnish painter.

Personal life
Godenhjelm was born in Mäntyharju. His parents were the county surveyor Adolf Fredrik Godenhjelm and Maria Elizabeth Argillander. His wife was Alexandra Fredrika Hornborg (died 1871). Their son B. F. Godenhjelm became a teacher.

Early career
He studied landscape painting in Stockholm under , and later he studied copper drawing in Saint Petersburg. He initially began his career in the courts, where he worked as an articled clerks deputy judge in 1826. However soon after he transitioned to painting, primarily producing commissioned works for churches and portraits.

Works and memberships

During his career, he painted dozens of altarpieces including ones for the Mäntyharju church, the Lovage church, the Liperi church (1842), the Jämsä church (1848), the Ikaalinen church (1874) and Finnish Lutheran Church in Sitka, Alaska founded by Uno Cygnaeus in 1840. Godenhjelm was head teacher at the Academy of Fine Arts, Helsinki drawing school from 1848 to 1869.

Works

See also
 Art in Finland

References

 Ilmari Heikinheimo: Finland elämäkerrasto. Helsinki: Werner Söderström Corporation, 1955. Page 232

1754 births
1797 deaths
People from Mäntyharju
Swedish-speaking Finns
18th-century Finnish painters
18th-century male artists
Finnish male painters